The Fenner Hills are a low mountain range in the eastern Mojave Desert, in eastern San Bernardino County, southern California.

They are located within the southeastern corner of Mojave National Preserve, and are east of the Providence Mountains, near the junction of Goffs and Lanfair Roads.

They run perpendicular to Interstate 40 and historic Route 66 to the south.

References 

Mountain ranges of the Mojave Desert
Mojave National Preserve
Mountain ranges of San Bernardino County, California
Hills of California
Mountain ranges of Southern California